Imperial Resort Beach Hotel is a hotel in Entebbe, Uganda.

Location
It is located on the shores of Lake Victoria, Africa's largest fresh-water lake, not far from Uganda's largest airport, Entebbe International Airport. The coordinates of Imperial Resort Beach Hotel are:00 02 48N, 32 28 16E (Latitude:0.0467; Longitude:32.4710).

Overview
The establishment has 181 rooms, on 4 (four) floors. Of the rooms, five (5) are junior suites and one (one) is a presidential suite. The hotel is a member of the Imperial Hotels Group, which owns three hotels in Entebbe and three others in Kampala. As of July 2014, the groups hotels and real estate holdings include the following:

 Entebbe, Uganda
 Imperial Resort Beach Hotel
 Imperial Botanical Beach Hotel
 Imperial Golf View Hotel

 Kampala, Uganda
 Imperial Royale Hotel
 Grand Imperial Hotel
 Equatoria Shopping Mall

External links
 Imperial Hotels Group Homepage
 Hotel Profile at Southtravels.com
  Profile At Allafrica.com

See also
 Imperial Hotels Group
 Entebbe

References

Hotels in Entebbe
Wakiso District
Hotels in Uganda
Hotel buildings completed in 2004
Hotels established in 2004